Lone Castrup Jørgensen (born 23 April 1962) is a Danish-born equestrian, who has been representing Australia since 2019. She competed at the 2000 Summer Olympics and the 2004 Summer Olympics.

References

External links
 

1962 births
Living people
Danish female equestrians
Danish dressage riders
Australian dressage riders
Olympic equestrians of Denmark
Australian female equestrians
Equestrians at the 2000 Summer Olympics
Equestrians at the 2004 Summer Olympics
Sportspeople from Copenhagen
Danish emigrants to Australia